Matynia is a Polish surname. Notable people with the surname include:

 Hubert Matynia (born 1995), Polish footballer

See also
 

Polish-language surnames